The 2021 U Sports Women's Final 8 Basketball Tournament was scheduled to be held March 11–14, 2021, in Kingston, Ontario. However, on October 15, 2020, it was announced that the championship was cancelled due to the COVID-19 pandemic.

The tournament was scheduled to be hosted by Queen's University at their Athletic and Recreation Centre (ARC), which would have been the first time that Queen's would have hosted the championship game.

See also 
2021 U Sports Men's Basketball Championship

References

External links 
 Tournament Web Site

U Sports Women's Basketball Championship
2020–21 in Canadian basketball
2021 in women's basketball
Queen's University at Kingston